Ólafur Benediktsson (born 3 August 1952) is an Icelandic former handball player who competed in the 1972 Summer Olympics.

References

1952 births
Living people
Olafur Benediktsson
Olafur Benediktsson
Handball players at the 1972 Summer Olympics